Van Duyn v Home Office (1974) C-41/74 was a case of the European Court of Justice concerning the free movement of workers between member states.

Facts
Van Duyn, a Dutch national, claimed the British Government, through the Home Secretary, infringed TFEU article 45(3) (then TEEC art 48(3)) by denying her an entry permit to work at the Church of Scientology. The Free Movement of Workers Directive 64/221/EC article 3(1) also set out that a public policy provision had to be 'based exclusively on the personal conduct of the individual concerned'. The UK had not done anything to expressly implement this element of the Directive. The government had believed Scientology to be harmful to mental health, and discouraged it but did not make it illegal. She sued, citing the Treaty of Rome and Community law, arguing that the Directive should apply to bind the UK. She was not being refused because of 'personal conduct'. Pennycuick VC referred the case to the European Court of Justice. The Home Office argued the provision was not directly effective, because it left the Government the discretion to apply exceptions to free movement.

Judgment
The European Court of Justice held that van Duyn could be denied entry if it was for reasons related to her personal conduct, as outlined in the Directive 64/22/EEC. TEEC article 48 was directly effective, even though the application of the provision was 'subject to judicial control'. Furthermore, the Directive was directly effective against the UK government. First, it would be incompatible with the binding effect of Directives to exclude the possibility of direct effect. Second, the practical efficacy of the Directive would be reduced unless individuals could invoke them before national courts. Third, because the ECJ has jurisdiction to give preliminary rulings under TFEU article 267 (then TEEC article 177) on 'acts of the institutions... of the Union' this implied all acts should be directly effective.

Crucially, the ECJ proceeded to permit the UK's derogation, thereby approving (on this occasion) the UK's decision to ban Ms Duyn because Scientology was then deemed by the UK to be harmful and undesirable:

Significance

The main significance of the case is not the decision itself, but the fact that ECJ held that EU directives can have direct effect on an individual. The Court laid down in its judgment that a directive has direct effect when its provisions are unconditional and sufficiently clear and precise and when the EU Member State has not transposed the directive by the deadline. The Court reasoned that if the directive did not have direct effect, then it would lose its relevance. Therefore, directives had to have direct effect.

They changed their reasoning later in Pubblico Ministero v Ratti, but the principle persisted.

See also

EU law
Direct effect

References

Court of Justice of the European Union case law
1974 in case law
1974 in the United Kingdom
Home Office litigation
Scientology litigation
Scientology in the United Kingdom
United Kingdom labour case law
European Union labour case law
1974 in the European Economic Community